Fabletics is a global, active lifestyle brand that sells both men's and women's sportswear, footwear and accessories, commonly referred to as "activewear". The company operates on a membership model and is known for its e-commerce business approach and also has over 85 brick-and-mortar stores. The brand has a membership program that allows shoppers to become "VIP Members", with access to special membership discounts and perks. Fabletics offers its members personalized outfits chosen for them based on their lifestyle and fashion preferences and releases capsules weekly in sizes XXS-4X for women and monthly in sizes XS-XXL for men. One of the co-founders of the company is  Kate Hudson.

History  
Fabletics launched in 2013, and was co-founded by Adam Goldenberg, Don Ressler, Ginger Ressler, and Kate Hudson. In 2015, under the umbrella of fashion incubator TechStyle Fashion Group, Fabletics was its fastest-growing label. At its locations, Fabletics stocks apparel based on analytics of its online trends. The company added collections for dresses and swimwear in the spring of 2017. In September 2017, Fabletics announced its first line of official footwear including slip-ons, lifestyle sneakers, and workout shoes.  In 2020, Fabletics announced that it had surpassed $500 million in annual revenue and has more than 2 million VIP members.

In April 2020, Fabletics expanded to menswear, signing Kevin Hart as an investor and the face of the new brand. In March 2021, Fabletics released its Fabletics Fit app, which has hundreds of on-demand workouts, meditations and other content. Fabletics VIP members can access the app as part of the program, but nonmembers must pay $14.95 per month. The company expanded into loungewear in 2021 and has since launched a velour capsule with actress Vanessa Hudgens. Fabletics was named to Newsweek Best Customer Service List of 2022. In January 2022, Fabletics announced that Kate Hudson would be transitioning from principal face of the brand to an advisory role.

In May 2022, they launched a tennis line for both men and women.

Locations
In the fall of 2015, Fabletics expanded to brick and mortar retail with its first store in Bridgewater, New Jersey. Since then Fabletics has opened over 73 North American stores and expanded into Europe. In October 2021, Fabletics opened its first non-US store in Berlin which was followed the company's first UK store, an experiential pop-up, on London's Regent Street. The London and Berlin stores bring Fabletics to 75 stores worldwide. Fabletics was one of few retailers to avoid layoffs during  the Covid-19 pandemic, and shifted retail staff to "omni-associates" during this time. Fabletics has developed and deployed OmniSuite, a proprietary, cloud-based enterprise retail platform, in all of its stores. OmniSuite combines e-commerce, POS and order management solutions with back-office systems, and is utilized in all Fabletics retail locations. As of 2020, Fabletics has established carbon neutrality at all of its stores, transitioned away from plastic shipment bags to recycled, biodegradable and reusable polybags and launched an eco-conscious capsule for Earth Day 2020 made entirely from recycled or upcycled materials. The company expanded into retail resale with ThredUp, in 2021.

In May 2022, they opened a new location in Valencia, CA.

Partnerships
Hudson was named the ambassador for Fashion Targets Breast Cancer with Fabletics partnering on a pink capsule collection to support breast cancer awareness. In May 2017, the company announced a collaboration with singer Demi Lovato in support of the United Nations Foundation's Girl Up campaign. In October 2018, Fabletics announced a partnership with Varsity Spirit, making Fabletics Varsity's official activewear partner. As a part of this deal, Fabletics launched pop-up shops at Varsity Competitions in the US. In October 2020, Fabletics and Varsity extended their partnership through 2024. In October 2020, Fabletics announced a long-term partnership with Hydrow, the at-home rower with live and on-demand athlete-led workouts. As part of the Fabletics x Hydrow partnership, Fabletics members can purchase a Hydrow at members only pricing, plus access to an accessories and gear package. In addition, Fabletics is Hydrow's official apparel partner, designing and producing all Hydrow apparel, and Hydrow's trainers will exclusively wear Fabletics in all of Hydrow's workout content. In 2021, Tough Mudder chose Fabletics as its "active lifestyle" partner. In November 2021, Fabletics began working with college athletes and tournaments to grow its men's business. The company sponsored the Jacksonville Classic, and announced that it is planning partnerships with individual NCAA players.

Since launching, Fabletics has released a number of capsules with notable brand partners, including Maddie Ziegler, Kelly Rowland, Madelaine Petsch and others. In April 2021, Kevin and Eniko Hart released the Hart Collection, the brand's first capsule designed for men and women. In December 2021, Vanessa Hudgens was announced as a spokesperson for the brand, releasing the Velour x Fabletics collection, with pieces made of velour.  In April 2022, Hudgens also released a summer Y2K-inspired collection designed by herself, called Sun-Daze by Vanessa Hudgens.

In April 2022, Fabletics partnered with singer Lizzo to launch a size-inclusive (sizes of 6X to XS) shape-wear brand called Yitty.

Controversy
An investigation by Time magazine into Hippo Knitting, a manufacturing company that supplies Fabletics, received reports from at least 38 workers alleging sexual and physical abuse from management. A Fabletics spokesperson said the brand vowed to do "everything in [their] power to further remedy the situation". Production at Hippo Knitting stopped on May 3, 2021. After a three-month pause, Fabletics resumed production in August 2021 while taking steps to improve workers' rights, including a new anti-intimidation policy, a new grievance procedure and other initiatives.

References

External links 
 
 21st Century Fashion Company Bets on Tech & Media
 Kate Hudson's athleisure brand is doubling down on a strategy it borrowed from Apple and Warby Parker
 Kate Hudson's Fabletics Fiercely Giving Amazon A Run For Its Money

Companies based in Los Angeles
Sportswear brands
Fashion accessory brands
Online clothing retailers of the United States
Clothing brands of the United States
Fashion accessory companies
American companies established in 2013
Clothing companies established in 2013
Retail companies established in 2013
Internet properties established in 2013
Underwear brands
Sporting goods manufacturers of the United States
Subscription services
2013 establishments in California